Frankie L. Smith (born October 8, 1968) is a former American football cornerback. A star at Baylor, Smith was a 4th round selection (104th overall pick) in the 1992 NFL Draft by the Atlanta Falcons. He played in the National Football League (NFL) for the Miami Dolphins (1993-1995), the San Francisco 49ers (1996-1997), and the Chicago Bears (1998-2001). Frankie is now a coach at Groesbeck Independent School District.

External links
Frankie Smith profile at NFL.com 

1968 births
Living people
People from Groesbeck, Texas
Players of American football from Texas
American football cornerbacks
Baylor Bears football players
Miami Dolphins players
San Francisco 49ers players
Chicago Bears players